The ninth season of King of the Hill originally aired Sundays at 7:00–7:30 p.m. (EST) on the Fox Broadcasting Company from March 13, to July 24, 2005. The Region 1 DVD was released on April 7, 2015.

Production
The showrunners for the season were John Altschuler and Dave Krinsky.

Episodes

References

2005 American television seasons
King of the Hill 09